Sylvia Ströher (born 30 May 1954) is a German businesswoman, ranked by Forbes since 2003 as one of the wealthiest people in the world.

Life 
In 2004 the Stroher family sold their almost 80% stake in Wella AG, the world's second biggest professional hair care group, to Procter & Gamble for $4 billion.

Silvia Ströher's 25% share has made this great-granddaughter of the company founder a very wealthy woman. She's married to Ulrich Ströher, né Fette, a former nurse who took her name when they married. Ströher is an art collector.

References

External links
Forbes.com: Forbes World's Richest People

1955 births
Living people
20th-century German businesswomen
20th-century German businesspeople
21st-century German businesswomen
21st-century German businesspeople
German art collectors
Women art collectors
20th-century art collectors
21st-century art collectors